The Works (also known originally as the Works at Chattahoochee) is a partially completed  mixed-use development on the Upper Westside of Atlanta. It is being developed by Selig Development and will consist of 40 buildings, including several historic structures. As of 2020, the project is undergoing its first phase of construction, which will see  developed.

History 
Selig Developments, a subsidiary of Selig Enterprises, announced the development on August 11, 2017. The project would see the reconversion of 40 buildings on property in Atlanta's Upper Westside owned by Selig, which had accumulated much of the area over 50 years, which would be completed in phases over the course of five to ten years. The master plan called for several acres of greenspaces, 500,000 square feet of retail, 600,000 square feet of office space, a residential area, and a boutique hotel. In 2019, Selig announced that Scofflaw Brewing would open a 9,000 square foot brewery and taproom on the property. Additionally, a 16,000 square foot food hall would be built on the development. By 2020, substantial infrastructure had been completed as part of the first phase of development, which is expected to be completed by 2022. That same year, it was reported that the full development project could take between 12 to 15 years to complete. Discussing the development, Curbed Atlanta compared the project to Ponce City Market, another mixed-use development in Atlanta.

References

Bibliography

External links 
 

Mixed-use developments in Georgia (U.S. state)
Buildings and structures in Atlanta